ŠK Aqua Turčianske Teplice was a Slovak football team, based in the town of Turčianske Teplice.

The club was founded in 1911 as Baník Turčianske Teplice and in 1998 was renamed into ŠK Aqua Turčianske Teplice. In 2011, the club was dissolved due to financial problems.

References

Defunct football clubs in Slovakia
Association football clubs established in 1911
1911 establishments in Slovakia
Association football clubs disestablished in 2011
2011 disestablishments in Slovakia